Rajgarh is a town and a tehsil in Alwar district in the Indian state of Rajasthan. Bhangarh, Asia's most haunted place, is also present in Rajgarh, Alwar tehsil. It is a small town set in scenic hills dotted with forts, and features waterfalls, a valley, and the hills of Aravalli.

History

Rajgarh is a small town on State Highway 25, close to Sariska National Park, in Alwar district of Rajasthan. It lies on the main train route between Delhi and Jaipur. Rajgarh Fort was built by Raja Pratap Singh, the founder of the State of Alwar who is often referred to as the "Bismarck of Alwar". In 1771, Rajgarh Fort was the site of the old capital of Alwar state. Later the new capital was set up at Bala Kila, Alwar and Rajgarh was turned into the summer residence of the Alwar Royal family. Rajgarh boasts of the famous Baghraj Temple, a Step Well, historic fort, palaces and a bustling market. A 19th century British traveler described Rajgarh valley as "A Perfect Earthly Paradise" with the walls of the well-kept fort of Rajgarh, picturesquely perched on a hill rising out of a green and fertile. Mostly 80% population in Rajgarh is Meena

Rajgarh was an incredible , prosperous capital fort of Kshatriya Badgujar Rulers , which lost its glory after conflicts between Kachhwaha and Badgujar clans of Rajput lineages . Badgujars also were also an  important alliances to the Royal kingdom of Mewar . Badgujars formed major Harawal frontline army for Royal Army of Mewar.

Badgujars lost their identity after being slaughtered by Mughals for opposing the marriages of Badgujar daughters with them .

Badgujars chose to live with pride and maintain dignity of Kshatriya Dharma instead of living life based on rules set by others.

Rajgarh has the tomb of the father of famous Urdu Poet Mirza Ghalib within town limits. Rajgarh Tehsil also contains the historic town of Rajore, now called Rajorgarh, where an inscription was found of Maharadhiraj Parmeshwara Matthandeva of Gurjara-Pratihara lineage, dated to 960 AD. This is the only known inscription containing the terms "Gurjara Pratihara" (after 11century called Badgujar) to describe the lineage.

Rajgarh is the birthplace of freedom fighter Bhawani Sahai Sharma who was a senior member of Hindustan Socialist Republican Army. He served a jail term of more than 9 years at the hand of the British during the Indian Independence struggle. Bhawani Sahai Sharma later became an MLA from Thana Gazi, Alwar.

Geography and attractions
Rajgarh has an average elevation of 479 metres (1571 feet). It is a major agricultural centre with a RIICO rajasthan mineral industrial park.

Famous and Attractive places of Rajgarh are as follows.

 Bhangarh 
 Kala daata 
 Alewa waterfall
 Govind Dev Ji Temple 
 jagganath ji temple 
 Rajgarh Fort 
jharna
 The Haunted 7 chauk ki haweeli 
 The temple of Bairuji in Ratanpura Village 
 Baghraj Temple 
 Machari
 Ajabgarh
 sarsa mata mandir
 Narayani mata Mandir

Educational Institutions

Rajgarh has one of early built colleges of the British era in India which provides up to post graduate level education.

References

Cities and towns in Alwar district